Presidential elections were held in Kazakh SSR on 24 April 1990 to elect the president for a six-year term. Chairman of the Supreme Council Nursultan Nazarbayev was chosen to be the president by 317 of the 360 members. The election was uncontested.

Background 
On 24 April 1990, the Supreme Council adopted the law "On the establishment of the post of President of the Kazakh SSR and amendments and additions to the Constitution of the Kazakh SSR." The discussion of the establishment of the post took place. Some members of the council believed that the institution of the presidency would alienate the republic from the union center, create a legal framework for the complete independence of Kazakhstan, and could become the basis for authoritarianism. Others, on the contrary, unanimously supported the need to introduce the post of President in the republic, putting forward a variety of political and legal arguments.

317 members of the Surpeme Council elected its chairman Nursultan Nazarbayev to be the President while 18 were voted against. Nazarbayev from 1984 served as the Prime Minister of the Kazakh SSR. On 22 June 1989, he became the First Secretary of the Communist Party of Kazakhstan and then from 22 February 1990, he was chosen to the chairman of the Supreme Council.

Results

References 

1990 elections in the Soviet Union
1990 in the Kazakh Soviet Socialist Republic
1990
Single-candidate elections
1990 elections in Kazakhstan